The 2nd IAAF World Half Marathon Championships was held on October 3, 1993, in Brussels, Belgium. A total of 254 athletes, 133 men, 86 women and 35 juniors, from 49 countries took part.
Complete results were published.

Medallists

Race Results

Men's

Women's

Junior Men's

Team Results

Men's

Women's

Junior Men's

Participation
The participation of 254 athletes (168 men/86 women) from 49 countries is reported.

 (3)
 (2)
 (6)
 (6)
 (10)
 (3)
 (7)
 (1)
 (1)
 (1)
 (1)
 (4)
 (1)
 (11)
 (3)
 (10)
 (13)
 (2)
 (4)
 (4)
 (1)
 (9)
 (2)
 (10)
 (8)
 (5)
 (9)
 (2)
 (1)
 (1)
 (7)
 (5)
 (7)
 (1)
 (10)
 (5)
 (14)
 (13)
 (8)
 (3)
 (1)
 (2)
/ (1)
 (7)
 (6)
 (10)
 (10)
 (1)
 (1)

See also
1993 in athletics (track and field)

References

External links
IAAF World Half Marathon Championships 1992-2005 Facts & Figures

IAAF World Half Marathon Championships
Half Marathon Championships
World Athletics Half Marathon Championships
International athletics competitions hosted by Belgium